This article is a collection of statewide opinion polls conducted for the 2024 United States presidential election. The persons named in the polls are declared candidates or have received media speculation about their possible candidacy.

Arizona

Arkansas

California

Colorado

Connecticut

Florida

Georgia

Illinois

Iowa

Kansas

Louisiana

Maine

Massachusetts

Michigan

Mississippi

Missouri

Montana

Nevada

New Hampshire

New Mexico

New York

North Carolina

Ohio

Oklahoma

Oregon

Pennsylvania

Rhode Island

South Carolina

South Dakota

Texas

Utah

Washington

Wisconsin

Notes 

Partisan clients